GAC Toyota Motor Co., Ltd. is an automobile manufacturing company headquartered in Guangzhou, China and a joint-venture between GAC Group and Toyota Motor Company
for manufacturing Toyota's model platform in the Chinese market.
It was founded on 1 September 2004.

As of 2009, the company had a 320,001 units-per-year production capacity at a Nansha District production base and had established a target production capacity of 500,000, which by now may have been achieved. Such figures may consider engines and whole vehicles discrete.

History
The company was founded in 2004 as Guangzhou Toyota, and began production in May 2006 with the Aurion-based Camry model. The company began producing the Yaris in May 2008, the Highlander SUV in May 2009, the Camry Hybrid in April 2010, the E’Z in June 2011 and the Levin in July 2014. The company was then renamed to GAC Toyota in December 2008.

Subsidiary 

 GAC Toyota Engine Co., Ltd. (GTE)

Current products

Current imported products

Former products

Former imported products

Leahead

Leahead is an electric car marque owned by GAC Toyota. It was announced in October 2014. A concept of the first production car for the marque, the Leahead i1, was unveiled at the 2015 Shanghai Motor Show and the production-ready version was unveiled at the Guangzhou Auto Show later that year.

Recalls 
In 2018, Leahead i1s were recalled for replacing their defective Takata airbags.

See also 
 FAW Toyota

References

External links
GAC Toyota Official website (Chinese only)

GAC Group joint ventures
Car manufacturers of China
Toyota factories
Motor vehicle assembly plants in China
Vehicle manufacturing companies established in 2004
Chinese-foreign joint-venture companies
Electric vehicle manufacturers of China